The Watergraafsmeer is a polder in the Netherlands. It was reclaimed in 1629. In the 17th and 18th centuries, there were many buitenplaatsen in the Watergraafsmeer, though nowadays only one, Frankendael, remains.

Since 1921, the Watergraafsmeer is part of the city of Amsterdam and its rural character has all but disappeared. It is located in the borough of Amsterdam-Oost.
The most important streets in the Watergraafsmeer are the Middenweg and the Kruislaan.

Famous persons
 Johan Cruyff, football player
 Max Euwe, Dutch chess player, Dutch chess champion, world chess champion (1935-37), international chess arbiter
 Nola Hatterman, actress and painter
 Samuel Jessurun de Mesquita, a graphic artist
 Gerard Reve, Dutch writer
 Karel van het Reve, Dutch writer, translator, literary historian

Former municipalities of North Holland
Neighbourhoods of Amsterdam
Polders of North Holland
Former boroughs of Amsterdam
Amsterdam-Oost